Ordronaux may refer to:

John Ordronaux (privateer) (1778-1841), French-American privateer
John Ordronaux (doctor) (1830-1908), American physician and lawyer, son of John Ordronaux (privateer)
, United States Navy World War II Benson-class destroyer